is a train station in Shibecha, Hokkaidō, Japan.

Lines
Hokkaido Railway Company
Senmō Main Line Station B62

Adjacent stations

External links
 JR Hokkaido Isobunnai Station information 

Stations of Hokkaido Railway Company
Railway stations in Hokkaido Prefecture
Railway stations in Japan opened in 1929